Percival Jackson Heather (6 October 1882 – 29 June 1956) was an Australian cricketer who played 13 matches of first-class cricket between 1904 and 1914.

Born in Melbourne, Heather went to South Africa in 1902, joining the South African Constabulary under the command of Robert Baden-Powell. A forceful batsman, good change bowler and brilliant fieldsman who could also keep wicket, Heather played for Natal and Transvaal. After returning to Australia in 1913 he played one match for Victoria in 1913-14.

His highest first-class score was 109 not out for Transvaal against Border in 1910-11. In a low-scoring match Transvaal needed 165 to win and were 27 for 3 when Heather went to the crease. Batting only 65 minutes, he hit seven fours and nine sixes to take Transvaal to victory by six wickets.

See also
 List of Victoria first-class cricketers

References

External links
 

1882 births
1956 deaths
Australian cricketers
KwaZulu-Natal cricketers
Gauteng cricketers
Victoria cricketers
Cricketers from Melbourne